Thomas Scott is a British YouTuber and web developer. His self-titled YouTube channel offers educational videos across a range of topics including history, geography, science, technology, and linguistics. He also has four other channels: Matt and Tom (featuring Matt Gray), Tom Scott plus (which features collaborations with a number of other creators), The Technical Difficulties (which features him with the other members of the comedy troupe of the same name) and Lateral with Tom Scott (a podcast based on his 2018 game show of the same name).  his five YouTube channels have collectively gained over 6.88  million subscribers and  billion views.

Early work
Originally from Mansfield, Nottinghamshire, United Kingdom, Scott graduated from the University of York with a degree in linguistics and English language, and later earned a Master of Arts in educational studies. While at university, in 2004, Scott produced a website parodying the British government's "Preparing for Emergencies" website, including a section explaining what to do in case of a zombie apocalypse. This resulted in the Cabinet Office demanding the site be taken down. Scott sent a "polite response declining to take down the site";  the site is still live.

In 2009, Scott became the UK organiser of International Talk Like a Pirate Day, and was subsequently nominated by his friends to run for student president at the University of York Students' Union, under the guise of his Talk Like a Pirate Day persona, "Mad Cap'n Tom Scott". Despite running as a joke, with almost 3000 votes, he won the election and served as the organisation's 48th president. When he was on the podcast Corridor Cast, he said that it was terrible as he did not know what to do, so his team would fill in for him. That same year, Scott and three friends formed the comedy troupe, The Technical Difficulties, with whom he hosted a radio show of the same name on University Radio York. The show later won the Kevin Greening award at the Student Radio Awards.

After graduating, Scott made several appearances on British television shows both as a contestant and presenter. He captained the Hitchhikers in series 3 of BBC Four's Only Connect in 2010 but was knocked out by the Strategists in the semi-finals, and, in 2012, was a presenter in the Sky 1 series Gadget Geeks alongside Colin Furze and Creative Technologist Charles Yarnold, where he was responsible for the creation of software solutions.

In 2010, Scott and the Technical Difficulties troupe began the "Reverse Trivia Podcast" series on the Technical Difficulties website wherein Scott would read the answer to a 1984 trivia question card while his fellow panellists attempted to guess the question.

Scott received widespread coverage in 2013 for "Actual Facebook Graph Searches", a Tumblr site which exposed a potentially embarrassing and dangerous collection of public Facebook data using Facebook's Graph Search, such as showing men in Tehran who have said that they were "interested in men" or "single women who live nearby and are interested in men and like getting drunk".

YouTube career
Scott registered his main YouTube channel, Tom Scott (originally under the username "enyay", derived from the Spanish name of the letter Ñ, "eñe", a username he has mentioned he "despised"), on 17 May 2006. At the start of his YouTube channel, Scott uploaded several cooking videos in which he would cook food in odd ways.Scott produces and uploads educational videos to the channel across a range of topics including linguistics, history, geography, science and technology. Also hosted on the channel is the series  with The Technical Difficulties which ran for eight seasons, from March 2014 to November 2018. In this series Scott would walk through a chosen Wikipedia article, while his fellow panellists attempted to guess facts about the article. He additionally produced explanations of computer security issues on Brady Haran's YouTube channel, Computerphile. He is known for wearing red T-shirts, originally worn out of a need for continuity during filming, and because Scott was wearing a red t-shirt in the primary picture he used on his personal website at the time, and used red as the accent colour for the website.

At the end of 2015, Scott launched a collaborative YouTube channel with his colleague and friend, Matt Gray, called Matt & Tom. The channel hosted The Park Bench wherein the pair would sit on a park bench and discuss videos, their travels, and other anecdotes. The series was produced weekly from its inception until 24 March 2018, when they announced that the series would no longer be produced on a regular schedule due to time constraints. In late 2018, the channel became a vehicle for videos of The Technical Difficulties, including "The Experiments" (2018), where the troupe piloted a number of game show ideas. The channel then aired their series entitled Two of These People Are Lying, in which Scott had to guess which of the troupe was giving accurate information pertaining to a Wikipedia article whose title he had drawn from a prepared stack. This show has since stopped, with only irregular special episodes being released, and The Technical Difficulties have moved to their own YouTube channel.

In November 2018, Scott founded Pad 26 Limited, a company offering content production, format development, and YouTube consultancy.

In 2021, Scott challenged artificial intelligence education YouTuber Jordan Harrod to create a deepfake version of him for $100. In a collaboration video posted on his channel, Harrod succeeded in doing so and also discussed the tech and dangers associated with deepfakes.

Also in 2021, Scott launched two new YouTube channels: Tom Scott plus on 14 June, focused on collaboration videos with other YouTubers, and The Technical Difficulties on 2 July, inactive until 7 July 2022 when he published the first video. 

In March 2022, Scott collaborated on Tom Scott plus with musician Beardyman (also brother of Jay Foreman), creating together a hyperpop song named "Shelter me from the rain", which was released under the name "MC HyperScott" to Spotify on 5 March 2022.

Amazing Places 
Scott has a series of videos dedicated to talking about certain places around the world called Amazing Places. In 2016, Scott published a video about the geology of the Wharfe River in Yorkshire, England. In 2020, Scott posted a video where he travelled to Iceland's northernmost islet, Kolbeinsey. Also in 2020, Scott posted a video about Wunderland Kalkar, an amusement park in Germany inside a nuclear power plant. In October 2021, he visited the only float-through McDonald's in the world located in Hamburg, Germany.

Tom's Language Files 
One series of videos on Scott's channel is called Tom's Language Files. The videos are based on linguistics and the grammatical structures of languages. Some of the entries in this series are co-written by linguists Gretchen McCulloch and Molly Ruhl.

The Basics 
Scott also has a series on computer science, called The Basics. In these, he covers the fundamentals of IT, and also has made videos on actual exploits, bugs with technology.

2010 UK general election

In 2010, after losing a bet that the New Orleans Saints would lose Super Bowl XLIV, Scott ran for Parliament in the Cities of London and Westminster constituency as the joke candidate "Mad Cap'n Tom". This was a role he had previously assumed in the 2008 race for presidency of the University of York Students' Union, which he had unintentionally won. Coincidentally, Scott stood against the Pirate Party candidate Jack Nunn, which was described on the BBC's News Quiz as "a split in the pirate vote".

As part of his bid, he promised to scrap taxes on rum, have schools offer courses in "swordsmanship and gunnery", hand out free rolls of duct tape to "fix broken Britain", and put a 50% tax on downloads of Cheryl Cole MP3s due to his dislike of the singer.

Scott described his chances of winning in the safe Conservative seat of Westminster as "Somewhere 'twixt a snowball's chance in hell an' zero." He received 84 votes (0.2% of the total), including the vote of Noel Gallagher, the former lead guitarist of Oasis.

Other projects
In 2014, Scott co-founded Emojli along with Matt Gray. It was a parody emoji-only social network based on social networking application Yo, and was described by Salon as "an inside joke turned into reality". It closed in July 2015 after it became too expensive to maintain. Scott followed this up in September 2015 by creating a full-size emoji keyboard out of fourteen standard keyboards to type every standard Unicode emoji.

Scott also worked for the Daily Mirror's UsVsTh3m, creating Flash games. UsVsTh3m shut down in 2015, but Scott maintains a few of these old games on his personal website.

Other web apps Scott has created include "Evil" (a web app that revealed the phone numbers of Facebook users), "Tweleted" (which showed posts deleted from Twitter), "What's Osama bin Watchin?" (which mashed together an image of Osama bin Laden with YouTube Internet memes), "Parliament WikiEdits" (a Twitter bot that tweets whenever an IP address from the Houses of Parliament edited Wikipedia), and "Klouchebag" (a satire of the social media rankings site Klout).

In December 2022, Scott appeared in two episodes of Christmas University Challenge as captain of the University of York team. Scott's team beat the Durham University team 200-45, but they lost in the semi-final to the University of Hull 155-100.

Accolades 
In 2022, Tom Scott won the Streamy Award for Learning and Education.

Notes

References

External links

Alumni of the University of York
English computer programmers
English male comedians
English television presenters
English YouTubers
Educational and science YouTubers
Living people
Online edutainment
People from Mansfield
Year of birth missing (living people)
Comedy YouTubers